The European Bowls Championship formerly the European Bowls Team Championships is a biennial continental lawn bowls tournament for European nations. From its inauguration in 1997 until September 2021, the tournament was organised by the European Bowls Union (EBU). Three events were held; Men's Pairs, Ladies Pairs and Mixed Fours, in which gold, silver and bronze medals are awarded. The overall champions are determined based on a points system.

In September 2021, the members of what was the "European Bowls Union" (E.B.U.) voted unanimously, to rebrand and be replaced by the newly formed, limited company, Bowls Europe Ltd (registered in Scotland).

History 
The tournament was established to enable smaller countries in Europe to participate competitively against other more established bowls playing countries maintaining the principal aim, of fostering and developing the sport of lawn bowls throughout Europe.

The first championship was held in 1997, with financial help from the Guernsey Tourist Board. The format of the championship has changed throughout the tournament's history.

Participating nations 
There are currently 19 member nations affiliated to Bowls Europe.

 Ireland

Championship Medalists

References 

Bowls competitions
Bowls in Europe
European international sports competitions
Recurring sporting events established in 1997
1997 establishments in Europe